The naval aviation arm of the Brazilian Navy operates 89 aircraft in 2009.

Torpedo

Weapons

References

External links
Brazilian Navy: Naval Aviation Command Official website 

Brazilian Navy, List of aircraft of the
aircraft, List of
Brazilian military aircraft
Aircraft